The men's 100 kilograms (Half heavyweight) competition at the 1998 Asian Games in Bangkok was held on 10 December 1998 at the Thammasat Gymnasium 1.

Schedule
All times are Indochina Time (UTC+07:00)

Results
Legend
IPP — Won by ippon
KOK — Won by koka
WO — Won by walkover
YUK — Won by yuko

Main bracket

Repechage

References 

Results
Top 8

M98
Judo at the Asian Games Men's Half Heavyweight